The 2011 Italian local elections were held on 15–16 May, with a second round on 29–30 May. In Italy, direct elections were held in all 1,177 municipalities and 11 provinces: in each municipality (comune) were chosen mayor and members of the City Council, in each province were chosen president and members of the Provincial Council. Of the 1,177 municipalities, 30 were provincial capital municipalities and only 105 had a population higher than 15,000 inhabitants.

In Sicily the elections were held on 29–30 May, with a second round on 12–13 June.

Citizens living in Italy  who were 18 or over on election day were entitled to vote in the local council elections. The deadline for voters to register to vote in the 15–16 May elections was midday on Saturday 15 April 2011.

Voting System
The voting system is used for all mayoral elections in Italy, in the city with a population higher than 15,000. Under this system voters express a direct choice for the mayor or an indirect choice voting for the party of the candidate's coalition. If no candidate receives at least 50% of votes, the top two candidates go to a second round after two weeks. This gives a result whereby the winning candidate may be able to claim majority support, although it is not guaranteed.

The election of the City Council is based on a direct choice for the candidate with a preference vote: the candidate with the majority of the preferences is elected. The number of the seats for each party is determined proportionally.

Municipal elections
Total voter turnout for the Municipal election on the first round was of 68.6%, on the second was of 60.1%.

Mayoral election results

Party results
Party votes in 29 provincial capital municipalities:

City councils

Provincial elections
Only 11 provinces were up for election. The elections was for a new provincial president and members of the Provincial Council. On the first round the total voter turnout was of 59.6%, on the second was of 45.2%.
Below the results of each candidate and coalition on the first and second round.

President election results

See also
2011 Bologna municipal election
2011 Milan municipal election

Notes

2011 elections in Italy
 
 
Municipal elections in Italy
Provincial elections in Italy
May 2011 events in Italy